13 West Street is a 1962 American neo noir crime film directed by Philip Leacock and starring Rod Steiger and Alan Ladd whose own production company produced the film.  It was based on the 1957 novel The Tiger Among Us (1957) by Leigh Brackett, who called the film "very, very dull".

Plot
For no discernible reason, scientist Walt Sherill is assaulted and viciously beaten by a group of well-dressed young men, the opposite of a slum dwelling street gang, when he is walking alone on a deserted street. When the police, including investigating juvenile officer Detective Koleski, are in his opinion too slow and too busy in finding the culprits, Sherill decides to go after them on his own.

Sherill proves to be an amateur sleuth at best, going over ground that the police have already covered. His wife uncomfortably watches him buy a gun and take target practice on tin cans. One night, Sherill spots a convertible that resembles one belonging to his assailants, and tails it at high speed. The driver is a frightened teenage girl who calls the police, and Sherill spends an uncomfortable night in the holding tank before Koleski has him released.

Sherill hires Finney, a private investigator, whose work leads him to Chuck Landry, the gang's leader. Sherill's non-stop search for revenge causes one member of the gang to commit suicide. Landry counters by luring Finney to a dangerous section of road where he is killed, then coming to Sherill's home where he menaces his wife, then plans to shoot Sherill when he returns home. Landry escapes from the police but as Sherill knows his address, he goes directly to the boy's home and beats him savagely. On the verge of killing him by drowning him in his family's swimming pool, Sherill finally relents, turning Landry over to Koleski to be placed under arrest.

Cast
Alan Ladd as Walt Sherill
Rod Steiger as Detective Sergeant Koleski
Michael Callan as Chuck Landry
Dolores Dorn as Tracey Sherill
Kenneth MacKenna as Paul Logan
Margaret Hayes as Mrs. Landry
Stanley Adams as Finney
Chris Robinson as Everett
Jeanne Cooper as Mrs. Quinn
Arnold Merritt as Bill
Mark Slade as Tommy
Henry Beckman as Detective Joe Bradford
Clegg Hoyt as Noddy

Production
Leigh Brackett's novel The Tiger Among Us was originally published in 1957. Film rights were purchased by producer Charles Schnee, who had just left MGM and signed a deal with Columbia Pictures. He hired John Michael Hayes to write the script. John Wayne was announced as a possible star. It was then reported that Valentine Davies was working on the script, which had been retitled Fear No Evil. Production plans were delayed when Schnee announced he was leaving Columbia, claiming he was unable to get any of his films in development made because of "almost insurmountable casting difficulties." The project stayed with Columbia and was assigned to producer Boris Kaplan. Roger Presnell wrote a version of the script. Philip Leacock was given the job as director and Alan Ladd and Rod Steiger were cast in the leads. The title The Tiger Among Us was changed out of fear audiences might expect a jungle film. The new title was 13 East Street then Alan Ladd requested "east" be changed to "west". "The story concerns a teenage gang from Los Angeles east side but I suggested the locale be switched to the swank purlieu of Bel Air", said Ladd. "I have nothing against Bel Air but I want to show that juvenile delinquency can breed in exclusive areas too."

Filming started April 1961.

See also
 List of American films of 1962
 List of hood films

References

External links

Trailer at TCMDB

1962 films
1962 crime drama films
American black-and-white films
American crime drama films
Columbia Pictures films
1960s English-language films
Films scored by George Duning
American films about revenge
Films based on American novels
Films directed by Philip Leacock
American vigilante films
American neo-noir films
1960s American films